The 1991 South Pacific Games was the ninth edition at which football was introduced. The games were held in Papua New Guinea during September 1991.

Group stage

Group 1

Group 2

Semi finals

Bronze medal match

Final

External links
Details on RSSSF website

1991
Football at the Pacific Games
Pac
P
1991 Pacific Games